Don C. Robinson is president of Baha Mar Resorts Ltd., a position he has held since January 2006.

Previously, Robinson spent 34 years in various roles with The Walt Disney Company, most recently as executive vice president and group managing director of Hong Kong Disneyland Resort.

References

External links
Baha Mar official site

Year of birth missing (living people)
Place of birth missing (living people)
Living people
American business executives
Walt Disney Parks and Resorts people
Disney executives